Tokelo Anthony Rantie (born 8 September 1990) is a South African professional soccer player who plays as a striker for the South Africa national team.

Club career

Early career
Born in Parys, Free State, Rantie started his career in different academies, most notably the Stars of Africa Academy in his native South Africa. Gabestar was his mentor. He proceeded to move to Ferroviário de Beira in 2010 and later CD Maxaquene in neighbouring Mozambique. In 2011, he moved to Swedish Division 2 side IFK Hässleholm on a loan deal from Stars of Africa Academy as part of their co-operation to bring South African players to Sweden.

Orlando Pirates
As Rantie had scored 10 goals in 12 games after half of the season he was loaned out to Orlando Pirates in the Premier Soccer League for the 2011–2012 season. He scored 7 chips in 20 games for the pirates. The club tried to convince Stars of Africa Academy to complete a full transfer but failed after the club's demands had been too high.

Malmö FF
On 9 August 2012, Allsvenskan club Malmö FF confirmed via their Twitter account that Rantie was joining the club. The transfer was a 17-month loan deal scheduled to end on 1 January 2014 with an option for Malmö to buy Rantie at a set price, the price was not disclosed. Rantie made his debut for the club on 16 August 2012 when he played 45 minutes in a friendly against Italian side Lazio. Rantie proceeded to score a hat-trick in his competitive debut for the club on 20 August 2012 when Malmö FF played Sandvikens IF away from home in the second round of Svenska Cupen, Malmö won the match 6–3 after extra time. On 27 August 2012 Rantie made his first league appearance for Malmö FF when he came into the game from the bench in the 62nd minute against GIF Sundsvall. Rantie later scored his first league goal for the club in the 89th minute, affirming the result 2–0 for his new club. Overall Rantie played 11 league matches and scored three league goals for Malmö FF during the 2012 season.

Rantie started the 2013 season with a knee injury which meant that he was out for the majority of the pre-season. He managed to score a spectacular goal in the first league match, a home fixture against Halmstads BK, when he managed to dribble past several defenders before scoring the first goal of the game and his first of the season via the crossbar. On 23 April 2013 Rantie signed a four-year contract until the end of the 2016 season to make him a permanent Malmö FF player. In total Rantie played 21 matches and scored seven goals for the club during the league title winning season. He was given permission by Bournemouth to return to the club for a couple of days in November 2013 to celebrate the title with the players and fans of Malmö FF.

AFC Bournemouth
Malmö FF confirmed on 28 August 2013 that they had sold Rantie to English club Bournemouth. The transfer fee was undisclosed but was reported to be a Bournemouth club record fee of £2.5 million. Rantie made his début on 17 September, replacing Scottish winger Ryan Fraser in a 1–0 win against Barnsley at the Goldsands Stadium. He made his first start for the club four days later in a 3–3 draw against Middlesbrough, lining up alongside strike partner Lewis Grabban before being replaced by Wes Thomas after 60 minutes. His first goal for the club came on 9 November, as he opened the scoring in a 1–1 draw against Burnley at Turf Moor, before Danny Ings scored late on to level the match. His second goal for the club came in January 2014, scoring the winning goal as Bournemouth beat Huddersfield Town 2–1. Rantie struggled to break into the starting eleven with Bournemouth top scorer Lewis Grabban and January signing Yann Kermorgant from Charlton Athletic being preferred by manager Eddie Howe. However, despite this, with the departure of Grabban to Norwich this summer for an estimated sum of £3,000,000 after his release clause from the new contract he signed just 6 months earlier was triggered, and a strong performance in the last game of the season in a 1–0 defeat away to Millwall by the South African.

Gençlerbirliği
On 26 August 2016, Bournemouth announced on their official website that Rantie had signed a permanent deal with Turkish side Gençlerbirliği for an undisclosed fee.

Mamelodi Sundowns
On 10 September 2019 he signed a 3-year contract with Mamelodi Sundowns.

Rantie's contract with Sundowns was terminated on 5 January 2020.

International career
Rantie made his senior national team debut for the South Africa national soccer team on 15 June 2012 in a friendly game against Gabon, scoring his first goal for Bafana Bafana in the process. In 2013 Rantie was picked for his first tournament with South Africa when he was selected as part of the 23 men squad for the 2013 Africa Cup of Nations held in South Africa.

Career statistics

Club

International
Updated 3 September 2017.

International goals
Scores and results list South Africa's goal tally first.

Honours
Orlando Pirates
 Premier Soccer League: 2011–12
 Telkom Knockout: 2011–12
Malmö FF
 Allsvenskan: 2013
Bournemouth
 Football League Championship: 2014–15

References

External links
 

1990 births
Living people
Soccer players from the Free State (province)
South African expatriate soccer players
Expatriate footballers in Mozambique
Expatriate footballers in Sweden
Expatriate footballers in England
Association football forwards
Orlando Pirates F.C. players
Malmö FF players
AFC Bournemouth players
Allsvenskan players
Division 3 (Swedish football) players
English Football League players
South African soccer players
South Africa international soccer players
2013 Africa Cup of Nations players
South African expatriate sportspeople in England
South African expatriate sportspeople in Mozambique
South African expatriate sportspeople in Sweden
2015 Africa Cup of Nations players
Clube Ferroviário da Beira players
Expatriate footballers in Turkey
Gençlerbirliği S.K. footballers
Süper Lig players
Premier League players
IFK Hässleholm players
Mamelodi Sundowns F.C. players